Bedok Point was a four-storey mall (with 2 basement stories) located in the town center of Bedok along New Upper Changi Road, and near Bedok MRT station, and it was officially opened on 26 April 2011. The mall held its soft opening on 16 December 2010. It has a range of retail units, entertainment outlets, a bookstore and food outlets.

History
Built on the site of the former Bedok and Changi theatres, Bedok Point was completed in late 2010 as the first air-conditioned mall in Bedok until the opening of Bedok Mall in 2013 at the Bedok Bus Interchange site. It had 76 specialty tenants, including anchors such as Harvey Norman and mainly restaurants and cafes. In 2011, the mall was divested into Frasers Centrepoint Trust by its developer, Frasers Centrepoint Ltd.

Bedok Point ceased operations from 1 July 2022. This is attributed to declining footfall as it faced competition from Bedok Mall and recently opened malls in eastern Singapore. It will be demolished and redeveloped into a mixed-used development named Sky Eden @ Bedok. Demolition has already commenced and the new development is slated to be completed in 2025.

References

Demolished buildings and structures in Singapore
Shopping malls in Singapore
Defunct shopping malls
Bedok
Shopping malls established in 2010
Shopping malls disestablished in 2022
2010 establishments in Singapore
2022 disestablishments in Singapore